Lim Yin Fun (born 13 November 1994) is a Malaysian badminton player. In 2016, she became the runner-up at the Romanian and Vietnam International Series tournament in the women's singles event.

Achievements

BWF International Challenge/Series 
Women's singles

  BWF International Challenge tournament
  BWF International Series tournament
  BWF Future Series tournament

References

External links 
 

1994 births
Living people
Sportspeople from Kuala Lumpur
Malaysian female badminton players
Malaysian sportspeople of Chinese descent
Badminton players at the 2014 Asian Games
Southeast Asian Games silver medalists for Malaysia
Southeast Asian Games medalists in badminton
Competitors at the 2015 Southeast Asian Games
Asian Games competitors for Malaysia
21st-century Malaysian women